Coventry Arena railway station is a railway station on the Coventry-Nuneaton Line. Located in the north of Coventry, England, it serves the adjacent Coventry Building Society Arena, for which it is named. It was opened on 18 January 2016, along with Bermuda Park station after considerable delays.

Combined with the stadium's parking it provides a Park and Ride facility. The station has two platforms on the double tracked line. The northbound platform, adjacent to the stadium, is three cars long, but the southbound platform is 6 cars long. Step-free access is provided to both platforms, and there are gates and holding facilities to cope with event-days at the Coventry Building Society Arena.

Although the station was intended to serve the adjacent arena, it was announced in August 2015 that the station will be closed for one hour preceding and following football matches, rugby matches and concerts on safety grounds: there is insufficient rolling stock to run the services necessary for spectators: while six-carriage trains could be chartered to run every half-an-hour during weekends, the fares generated would not cover the chartering cost. The then operator London Midland stated that the rolling stock restriction limited services to one train an hour using a single-coach  unit, which can only seat 75 people. In September 2015 it was revealed that Coventry City Council were looking into the possibility of using converted London Underground D-trains to run extra services on match days, although this did not happen. In 2019, two-coach  units took over the running of the service.

History 
No previous station has existed at this site.

Funding for the new station was approved in December 2011. However, a number of setbacks meant that construction did not begin until October 2014 with services projected to start in June 2015, although this was later pushed back several times. The station opened together with Bermuda Park railway station in Nuneaton on 18 January 2016.

Services
Sunday services do not start running until just before noon, but then run on the same frequency as on weekdays thereafter until end of service (but to Coventry only southbound).

References

Railway stations in Coventry
Railway stations opened by Network Rail
Railway stations in Great Britain opened in 2016
Railway stations served by West Midlands Trains